Peine is a railway station located in Peine, Germany. The station is located on the Hanover–Brunswick railway. The train services are operated by WestfalenBahn.

Train services
The station is served by the following service(s):

Regional services  Rheine - Osnabrück - Minden - Hanover - Braunschweig
Regional services  Bielefeld - Herford - Minden - Hanover - Braunschweig

References

External links 
 

Railway stations in Lower Saxony